The 1996–97 British National League season was the first season of the British National League, the second level of ice hockey in Great Britain. The  Swindon IceLords won the Premier League and the Fife Flyers won the Northern Premier League. The Swindon IceLords won the inter-league championship.

Premier League

First round

Final round

Playoffs

3rd place game 
 Kingston Hawks - Guildford Flames 3:9, 6:4

Final 
 Slough Jets - Swindon IceLords 4:3, 1:3

Northern Premier League

First round

Playoffs

Group A

Group B

Final

Inter-League Final 
 Fife Flyers - Swindon IceLords 0:5

External links 
 Season on hockeyarchives.info

British National League (1996–2005) seasons
United
2